The 34th New Brunswick Legislative Assembly represented New Brunswick between May 10, 1917, and September 16, 1920.

Gilbert Ganong served as Lieutenant-Governor of New Brunswick in 1917. He was succeeded by William Pugsley in November of that year.

William Currie was chosen as speaker in 1917. J.E. Hetherington became speaker after Currie resigned in 1919.

The Liberal Party led by Walter Edward Foster defeated the ruling Conservative party to form the government.

History

Members 

Notes:

References 
 Canadian Parliamentary Guide, 1920, EJ Chambers

Terms of the New Brunswick Legislature
1917 establishments in New Brunswick
1920 disestablishments in New Brunswick
20th century in New Brunswick